The Adventures of Samurai Cat is a collection of linked humorous fantasy short stories by Mark E. Rogers. Rogers had done a series of paintings and drawings which feature his character Samurai Cat and spoofing martial arts films and fantasy stories. He went on to write stories to fit the paintings. The collection was first published in 1984 by Donald M. Grant, Publisher, Inc. in an edition of 2,225 copies, of which 425 were issued as a deluxe edition, and were slipcased, signed and numbered.

Contents 
 "Katemusha"
 "The Bridge of Catzad-Dûm"
 "The Book of the Dunwich Cow"
 "Beyond the Black Walnut"
 "Against the Gods"

References

1984 short story collections
Fantasy short story collections
Parodies of films
Donald M. Grant, Publisher books